In logic and mathematics, necessity and sufficiency are terms used to describe a conditional or implicational relationship between two statements.

In general, a necessary condition is one that must be present in order for another condition to occur, while a sufficient condition is one that produces the said condition. The assertion that a statement is a "necessary and sufficient" condition of another means that the former statement is true if and only if the latter is true. That is, the two statements must be either simultaneously true, or simultaneously false.

In ordinary English (also natural language) "necessary" and "sufficient" indicate relations between conditions or states of affairs, not statements. For example, being a male is a necessary condition for being a brother, but it is not sufficient—while being a male sibling is a necessary and sufficient condition for being a brother.
Any conditional statement consists of at least one sufficient condition and at least one necessary condition.

Definitions

In the conditional statement, "if S, then N", the expression represented by S is called the antecedent, and the expression represented by N is called the consequent. This conditional statement may be written in several equivalent ways, such as "N if S", "S only if N", "S implies N", "N is implied by S",  and "N whenever S".

In the above situation, N is said to be a necessary condition for S. In common language, this is equivalent to saying that if the conditional statement is a true statement, then the consequent N must be true—if S is to be true (see third column of "truth table" immediately below). In other words, the antecedent S cannot be true without N being true. For example, in order for someone to be called Socrates, it is necessary for that someone to be Named. Similarly, in order for human beings to live, it is necessary that they have air.

In the above situation, one can also say S is a sufficient condition for N (refer again to the third column of the truth table immediately below). If the conditional statement is true, then if S is true, N must be true; whereas if the conditional statement is true and N is true, then S may be true or be false. In common terms, "the truth of S guarantees the truth of N". For example, carrying on from the previous example, one can say that knowing that someone is called Socrates is sufficient to know that someone has a Name.

Necessity

The assertion that Q is necessary for P is colloquially equivalent to "P cannot be true unless Q is true" or "if Q is false, then P is false". By contraposition, this is the same thing as "whenever P is true, so is Q".

The logical relation between P and Q is expressed as "if P, then Q" and denoted "P ⇒ Q" (P implies Q). It may also be expressed as any of "P only if Q", "Q, if P", "Q whenever P", and "Q when P". One often finds, in mathematical prose for instance, several necessary conditions that, taken together, constitute a sufficient condition (i.e., individually necessary and jointly sufficient), as shown in Example 5.

Example 1 For it to be true that "John is a bachelor", it is necessary that it be also true that he is
 unmarried,
 male,
 adult,
since to state "John is a bachelor" implies John has each of those three additional predicates.

Example 2 For the whole numbers greater than two, being odd is necessary to being prime, since two is the only whole number that is both even and prime.

Example 3Consider thunder, the sound caused by lightning. One says that thunder is necessary for lightning, since lightning never occurs without thunder. Whenever there is lightning, there is thunder. The thunder does not cause the lightning (since lightning causes thunder), but because lightning always comes with thunder, we say that thunder is necessary for lightning. (That is, in its formal sense, necessity doesn't imply causality.)

Example 4Being at least 30 years old is necessary for serving in the U.S. Senate. If you are under 30 years old, then it is impossible for you to be a senator.  That is, if you are a senator, it follows that you must be at least 30 years old.

Example 5In algebra, for some set S together with an operation  to form a group, it is necessary that  be associative. It is also necessary that S include a special element e such that for every x in S, it is the case that e  x and x  e both equal x.  It is also necessary that for every x in S there exist a corresponding element x″, such that both x  x″ and x″  x equal the special element e.  None of these three necessary conditions by itself is sufficient, but the conjunction of the three is.

Sufficiency

If P is sufficient for Q, then knowing P to be true is adequate grounds to conclude that Q is true; however, knowing P to be false does not meet a minimal need to conclude that Q is false.

The logical relation is, as before, expressed as "if P, then Q" or "P ⇒ Q". This can also be expressed as "P only if Q", "P implies Q" or several other variants. It may be the case that several sufficient conditions, when taken together, constitute a single necessary condition (i.e., individually sufficient and jointly necessary), as illustrated in example 5.

Example 1"John is a king" implies that John is male. So knowing that John is a king is sufficient to knowing that he is a male.

Example 2A number's being divisible by 4 is sufficient (but not necessary) for it to be even, but being divisible by 2 is both sufficient and necessary for it to be even.

Example 3 An occurrence of thunder is a sufficient condition for the occurrence of lightning in the sense that hearing thunder, and unambiguously recognizing it as such, justifies concluding that there has been a lightning bolt.

Example 4If the U.S. Congress passes a bill, the president's signing of the bill is sufficient to make it law. Note that the case whereby the president did not sign the bill, e.g. through exercising a presidential veto, does not mean that the bill has not become a law (for example, it could still have become a law through a congressional override).

Example 5That the center of a playing card should be marked with a single large spade (♠) is sufficient for the card to be an ace. Three other sufficient conditions are that the center of the card be marked with a single diamond (♦), heart (♥), or club (♣). None of these conditions is necessary to the card's being an ace, but their disjunction is, since no card can be an ace without fulfilling at least (in fact, exactly) one of these conditions.

Relationship between necessity and sufficiency

A condition can be either necessary or sufficient without being the other.  For instance, being a mammal (N) is necessary but not sufficient to being human (S), and that a number  is rational (S) is sufficient but not necessary to  being a real number (N) (since there are real numbers that are not rational).

A condition can be both necessary and sufficient. For example, at present, "today is the Fourth of July" is a necessary and sufficient condition for "today is Independence Day in the United States".  Similarly, a necessary and sufficient condition for invertibility of a matrix M is that M has a nonzero determinant.

Mathematically speaking, necessity and sufficiency are dual to one another.  For any statements S and N, the assertion that "N is necessary for S" is equivalent to the assertion that "S is sufficient for N". Another facet of this duality is that, as illustrated above, conjunctions (using "and") of necessary conditions may achieve sufficiency, while disjunctions (using "or") of sufficient conditions may achieve necessity.  For a third facet, identify every mathematical predicate N with the set T(N) of objects, events, or statements for which N holds true; then asserting the necessity of N for S is equivalent to claiming that T(N) is a superset of T(S), while asserting the sufficiency of S for N is equivalent to claiming that T(S) is a subset of T(N).

Simultaneous necessity and sufficiency

To say that P is necessary and sufficient for Q is to say two things:
 that P is necessary for Q, and that P is sufficient for Q, .  
 equivalently, it may be understood to say that P and Q is necessary for the other, which can also be stated as each is sufficient for or implies the other.

For example, in graph theory a graph G is called bipartite if it is possible to assign to each of its vertices the color black or white in such a way that every edge of G has one endpoint of each color.  And for any graph to be bipartite, it is a necessary and sufficient condition that it contain no odd-length cycles.  Thus, discovering whether a graph has any odd cycles tells one whether it is bipartite and conversely.  A philosopher might characterize this state of affairs thus: "Although the concepts of bipartiteness and absence of odd cycles differ in intension, they have identical extension.

In mathematics, theorems are often stated in the form "P is true if and only if Q is true". 

See also

References

External links

Critical thinking web tutorial: Necessary and Sufficient Conditions
Simon Fraser University: Concepts with examples

 
Concepts in logic
Concepts in metaphysics
Dichotomies
Mathematical terminology